"Sommartider" (in English: "Summertimes"), written by Per Gessle, is the song that throughout the years has become considered the signature song for Swedish pop group Gyllene Tider. It was released as a single on 18 June 1982. It was re-released both on 27 June 1989 and in 1995. The original version peaked at number six on the Swedish Singles Chart and number three on the Norwegian Singles Chart, and the 1989 version peaked at number three on the Swedish Singles Chart. It has been certified gold in Sweden. "Sommartider" was also recorded with lyrics in the English language, with the name "Summer City". It has over the years become a popular long time hit song, often played by radio and other public media also after 2020.

Track listing

1982
A1. "Sommartider" - 3:18
B1. "Tylö Sun" - 2:41
B2. "Vart tog alla vänner vägen?" - 2:49

1989
A1. "Sommartider" '89 remix - 7:38
B1. "Sommartider" - 3:18
B2. "Tylö Sun" - 2:41
B3. "Vart tog alla vänner vägen?" - 2:49

1995
"Sommartider"
"Tylö Sun"
"Vart tog alla vänner vägen?"

Charts

1982 version

1989 version

References

1982 singles
1989 singles
1995 singles
Gyllene Tider songs
Songs written by Per Gessle
1982 songs
EMI Records singles